Life is the fifth studio album by British pop and soul band Simply Red, released in 1995. The lead single "Fairground" became their first number 1 hit in the UK. Due to this success, the album also made #1 on the UK album chart. It also included "We're in This Together", the official theme song for Euro '96. This was also the last album to feature band members Fritz McIntyre and Heitor TP.

Track listing
All songs composed by Mick Hucknall
"You Make Me Believe" – 3:51
"So Many People" – 5:19
"Lives and Loves" – 3:21
"Fairground" – 5:33
"Never Never Love" – 4:19
"So Beautiful" – 4:58
"Hillside Avenue" – 4:45
"Remembering the First Time" – 4:43
"Out on the Range" – 6:00
"We're in This Together" – 4:14

2008 Special Edition bonus tracks
 "Fairground" (Rollo and Sister Bliss Remix) – 9:06
 "Remembering the First Time" (Satoshi Tomie Classic 12" Mix) – 8:53 
 "Never Never Love" (Too Precious Club Radio Mix) – 4:22
 "We're in This Together" (Universal Feeling Mix) – 4:15 
 "You Make Me Believe" (Howie B Mix) – 4:01

Personnel 
Simply Red
 Mick Hucknall – lead vocals, backing vocals, guitars, bass, string arrangements
 Fritz McIntyre – keyboards, backing vocals
 Ian Kirkham – keyboards, saxophones, EWI
 Heitor TP – guitars
 Dee Johnson – backing vocals

Guest musicians
 Andy Wright – keyboards, programming, string arrangements
 Robbie Shakespeare – bass
 Bootsy Collins – bass
 Sly Dunbar – drums, programming
 Ritchie Stevens – drums
 Danny Cummings – percussion
 Hugh Masekela – flugelhorn
 Umoja Singers Chorale – choir 
 The London Metropolitan Orchestra – strings
 Caroline Dale – string arrangements and conductor

The video for "Never Never Love" featured several women, including British actresses Billie Whitelaw and Stephanie Beacham, and fashion models like Kirsten Owen, for example.

Production
 Producers – Mick Hucknall and Stewart Levine
 Album Coordinator – Merv Pearson
 Engineered and Mixed by Roland Herrington and Femi Jiya
 Assistant Engineers – Jake Davies, Aiden Love, Bernard O'Reilly and Andy Strange.
 Recorded at Planet 4 Studios (Manchester, England); AIR Studios (London, England); Downtown Studios (Johannesburg, South Africa).
 Mixed at Whitfield Street Studios (London, England).
 Mastered by Bernie Grundman at Bernie Grundman Mastering (Hollywood, CA).
 Art Direction – Mat Cook and Zanna
 Design – Mat Cook 
 Photography – Zanna
 Management – Lisa Barbaris, Andy Dodd and Elliot Rashman at So What Arts, Ltd.

Charts

Weekly charts

Year-end charts

Certifications and sales

References

Simply Red albums
1995 albums
East West Records albums
Albums produced by Stewart Levine